The Mystery of the Fire Dragon is the thirty-eighth volume in the Nancy Drew Mystery Stories series.  It was written under the pseudonym Carolyn Keene, and was first published in 1961.

Plot summary

Nancy Drew is called to New York City by her Aunt Eloise to solve a missing-person case. The granddaughter of her elderly Chinese author neighbor, Mr. Soong, has been kidnapped. The search is on, first by disguising Nancy's friend George Fayne as the missing Chi Che, and then pursuing a lead at Chi Che's place of employment, a book store, where Nancy encounters its suspicious owner, Mr Stromberg.

Nancy decides to visit the store again but as she goes along the sidewalk, Nancy is knocked-out by a falling vase which hits her on the head. While Nancy is unconscious, Bess and George take up the mystery and a red-haired man is quickly arrested.

A series of clues leads the girls to Hong Kong, where Nancy's boyfriend, Ned Nickerson, joins the action. Nancy foolishly follows "Chi Che" on board a plane, and is herself kidnapped. Ingenious Nancy uses her lipstick to signal for help on the plane windows. After her rescue, she follows more clues to an international smuggling ring, and, utilizing a disguised George once again, forces the thieves out of hiding and has the chance to finally locate the missing girl.

Production
This is the highest number volume in the series to be issued with a dust jacket.  The publishers commissioned new artwork for volume 12, The Message in the Hollow Oak, although the book text had not been updated and revised,  and The Mystery at Lilac Inn, which had been revised with a totally different story, now twenty chapters in length, and with a copyright of 1961. Subsequent volumes that were either updated or issued as new books integrated the artwork directly into the covers.

External links
 

1961 American novels
1961 children's books
Children's mystery novels
Nancy Drew books
Grosset & Dunlap books
Novels set in Hong Kong
Novels set in New York City